The Western Australian town of Meckering was struck by an earthquake on 14 October 1968. Total damage amounted to $2.2 million with 20–28 injured.

Earthquake
It damaged roads including the Great Eastern Highway, the Eastern Goldfields Railway and the Goldfields water pipeline.

Damage
The effect of the earthquake involved structures in Perth, the capital of Western Australia 130 km west of Meckering. It occurred mid-morning of a public holiday, the Queen's Birthday and theatres were packed with children.

See also
List of earthquakes in 1968
List of earthquakes in Australia
South West Seismic Zone

References

Sources

External links

1968 earthquakes
Earthquakes in Western Australia
Wheatbelt (Western Australia)
1960s in Western Australia